The Clásico Universitario is one of the most important rivalries of Chilean football and refers to any match contested between Universidad Católica and Universidad de Chile. This clásico (derby) has been recognized by FIFA as the most traditional of Chile. It is the oldest confrontation between two clubs from academic roots, as the first confrontation goes back to the University Classic of 1909. 

These two teams have played twenty championship definitions against each other (finals, semi-finals, qualifying in general), Universidad Católica has won thirteen and Universidad de Chile six.

Statistics
As of 21 October 2022

References

External links
 Universidad Católica
 Universidad de Chile
 Football Derbies
 

Universitario
Club Deportivo Universidad Católica
Club Universidad de Chile